William Ward Duffield (November 19, 1823 – June 22, 1907) was an executive in the coal industry, a railroad construction engineer, and an officer in the Union Army during the American Civil War. After the war he was appointed Superintendent of the U.S. Coast and Geodetic Survey.

Early life
Duffield was born in Carlisle, Pennsylvania, the son of Isabella Graham (Bethune), and the Reverend George Duffield, a prominent minister in the Presbyterian Church. He was also the brother of Brigadier General Henry M. Duffield. Although he would call Michigan home after 1836, throughout his life William worked and traveled widely. He graduated in 1842 from Columbia College, New York City, as a civil engineer, and two years later received a Master of Arts. He later studied law and was admitted to the Detroit bar. At the onset of the Mexican–American War he entered the U.S. Army as adjutant of the 2nd Tennessee Infantry. Later during the war he served on the staff of General Gideon J. Pillow. He went to California as an Army paymaster after the war and qualified as a founding member in the Society of California Pioneers. During this service he became well enough versed in the military sciences to author two books on the subject. After leaving the Army he worked as engineer and superintendent of railroads in New York; surveyed the Detroit and Milwaukee Railroad from Pontiac to Grand Haven, from Detroit to Port Huron, and from Mendota to Galesburg, Illinois.

Civil War
When the Civil War erupted, Duffield joined the 4th Michigan Infantry as its lieutenant colonel, and participated with the regiment in the First Battle of Bull Run. In September 1861 he resigned from the 4th and accepted a commission as colonel of the 9th Michigan Infantry.

On January 9, 1862, he was ordered to Bardstown, Kentucky, to head an officer examining board. From March 8 to May 14, 1862, he commanded the 23rd Brigade of the Army of the Ohio. On April 11, 1862, he was appointed acting brigadier general, but his appointment was not confirmed by the United States Senate; it was tabled on July 16, 1862. On May 9, 1862, he was appointed acting military governor of Kentucky. On July 12, 1862, Duffield arrived in Murfreesboro, Tennessee, in command of the 9th Michigan. The following day the Union garrison, under the overall command of Brig. Gen. Thomas T. Crittenden, was attacked and defeated by Confederate General Nathan Bedford Forrest in the First Battle of Murfreesboro. Col. Duffield received two gunshot wounds during the attack; one passing through the right testicle, the other through the left thigh. These, although very painful and bleeding profusely, did not prevent him from remaining with his own regiment until the attack was repulsed, when, fainting from pain and loss of blood. He was carried from the field. At noon the same day he was made prisoner by General Forrest, but, in his then helpless condition, was released upon his parole promising not to bear arms against the Confederate States until being regularly exchanged. He was exchanged on August 27, 1862.

Postbellum career
Duffield resigned from the Army on February 6, 1863, and returned to Michigan. After the war he had charge of coal mines in Pennsylvania and iron mines in Kentucky, and was chief engineer of the Kentucky Union Railroad. In 1879–1880 he served as a member of the Michigan State Senate. He was appointed by President Grover Cleveland as Superintendent of the U.S. Coast and Geodetic Survey, 1894–1898. He spent his last years in Washington, D.C., where he died. He is buried in Arlington National Cemetery.

Notes

References

Primary sources
Burton Historical Collection. Detroit Public Library, Detroit, Michigan. Duffield Family Papers.
Detroit, Michigan Advertiser & Tribune, 1861–1865
Detroit, Michigan Free Press, 1861–1865.
Oakland Historical House Museum, Murfreesboro, TN. Duffield Letters.

Books
American Biographical History of Eminent Self-Made Men, Michigan Edition Cincinnati, OH: Western Biographical Publishing Company. (1878)
Bennett, Charles Historical Sketches of the Ninth Michigan Infantry  Coldwater, MI: Daily Courier. (1913)
Bingham, Steven D. Early History of Michigan with Biographies of State Officers, Members of Congress, Judges and Legislators Lansing: Thorp and Godrey, State Printers (1888).
 Eicher, John H., and Eicher, David J., Civil War High Commands, Stanford University Press, 2001, .
Michigan Biographies: Including Members of Congress, Elective State Officers, Justices of the Supreme Court, Members of the Michigan Legislature, Board of Regents of the University of Michigan, State Board of Agriculture and State Board of Education 2 vols. Lansing, MI: Michigan Historical Commission (1924).
Wyeth, John Allan. That Devil Forrest: the Life of General Nathan Bedford Forrest 1899. Reprint. NY: Harpers, 1959.

Journal articles
King, William H. "Forrest's Attack on Murfreesboro, July 13, 1862." Confederate Veteran 32 (November 1924): 430-431.

Attribution

External links
Biographical notes

1823 births
1907 deaths
People from Carlisle, Pennsylvania
United States Army paymasters
Michigan state senators
Union Army colonels
United States Coast and Geodetic Survey personnel
People of Michigan in the American Civil War
Burials at Arlington National Cemetery
Columbia College (New York) alumni
19th-century American politicians
Military personnel from Pennsylvania